József Fabchich (March 13, 1753 – December 23, 1809) was a Hungarian writer, sacrificial priest and translator, known mainly for his translations of Ancient Greek poetry (namely Sappho, Alcman, Alcaeus, Anacreon, Stesichorus, Pindar and others) into the Hungarian language.

Fabchich was born in Kőszeg. Most of his translations were published in Győr in 1804. He also compiled the first Hungarian etymological dictionary in 1789–1794. He died in Győr, aged 56.

References

1753 births
1809 deaths
18th-century Hungarian male writers
18th-century translators
Hungarian translators
People from Kőszeg
People from Győr